Chah-e Mobarak is a village in Chah-e Mobarak Rural District of Chah-e Mobarak District, Asaluyeh County, Bushehr province, Iran. At the 2006 census, its population was 2,343 in 385 households when it was in Asaluyeh District of Kangan County. The following census in 2011 counted 3,348 people in 773 households. The establishment of Chah-e Mobarak District, of which the village is now a part, was officially announced on 12 December 2012. The latest census in 2016 showed a population of 4,968 people in 1,225 households; it was the largest village in its rural district.

References 

Populated places in Asaluyeh County

fa:چاه‌مبارک